Susan Elizabeth Jenkins (born 31 July 1955) is an English actress. She is most widely known for her roles as Gloria Todd in the ITV soap opera Coronation Street (1985–1988) and as Jackie Corkhill in the Channel 4 soap opera Brookside (1991–2001).

Career
Jenkins became an actress at the age of eighteen having studied at drama college. She worked in repertory theatres across the UK for the first 11 years of her career, performing in many productions, playing everything from Alan Ayckbourn to Shakespeare. Alan Bleasdale wrote the lead female role in Having a Ball for Jenkins.

She then started to work more on television including How We Used To Live and the cult TV programme, The Beiderbecke Affair. She first came to prominence in 1985 when she joined the cast of top-rated British soap opera, Coronation Street, playing barmaid Gloria Todd in 238 episodes. She left the show in 1988 after becoming pregnant with her second child, Richard, who played Craig Harris in the soap from 2002 until 2006. She returned to television in the series Coasting with Peter Howitt and from 1991 until 2001 playing the part of Jackie Corkhill in the Liverpool based, and often controversial, Channel 4 soap opera Brookside. She also appeared on Lily Savage's Blankety Blank in 2001.

Since leaving Brookside, Jenkins has continued to work steadily, in theatre and television, making guest appearances on British television, including In Deep, Holby City, Merseybeat, Dalziel & Pascoe, Midsomer Murders and Heartbeat. Jenkins also presented Loose Women in 2006. She returned to theatre, playing at the Royal Court Theatre in London in The People Are Friendly, Esther in Arthur Miller's The Price at the Library Theatre, Manchester and Maybe Tomorrow at the Royal Exchange, Manchester. She appeared in the film, Blue Collars and Buttercups and is regularly heard on BBC Radio 4 afternoon dramas. She has recorded over 200 radio plays and radio adaptations of classic serials over the years, including Middlemarch, Villette and Wuthering Heights with Derek Jacobi.

As a director, Jenkins wrote, produced and directed Night of Stars 1 and 2 at the Palace Theatre, Manchester, raising over £70,000 to build an orphanage in Thailand for orphaned children of the 2004 tsunami and to help children's charities in the UK. She directed Aladdin at the Tameside Hippodrome in 2006, produced her son, Richard Fleeshman's first concert in 2006 at the same theatre and produced and directed yet another musical extravaganza Gala Night of Stars there. She directed further pantomimes, namely Snow White at Grimsby Auditorium, and Cinderella at Southport's Floral Hall Theatre in 2012.

Jenkins made her debut in Emmerdale on 25 August 2008 as Bonnie Drinkwater. Her most recent television appearances were a second guest lead in Heartbeat and as a celebrity guest on The Alan Titchmarsh Show. She played Maureen in the BBC series Being Eileen written by Michael Wynne. Jenkins was voted 'Woman of the Year' in 2008 for her Charity work and was honoured by This Is Your Life in 2001. She performed in Eve Ensler's The Vagina Monologues at the Empire Theatre, Liverpool and in 2010 starred in the 3-month Autumn National Tour of The Vagina Monologues, playing in 65 theatres across the country.

In 2009, Jenkins appeared in an episode of Doctors starring opposite her own daughter, Emily Fleeshman. In 2013, she played Maureen in the BBC comedy-drama Being Eileen.
In June 2014, she produced and directed an open-air production of As You Like It at Plas Coch in Anglesey, her second production at the venue, having directed A Midsummer Night's Dream there in 2013.
Jenkins played Phyllis Feld, mother of Marc Bolan in the highly acclaimed UK national tour of 20th Century Boy until 19 July 2014.

In 2016, she filmed further guest leads in Casualty and Doctors for the BBC.

Jenkins has produced and directed major pantomimes in the UK and four studio productions at The Lowry Theatre.

She directed Build a Bonfire by Trevor Suthers and another Suthers' play, Toil and Trouble, for JB Shorts in April 2016. In 2017 at Salford Arts Theatre, she directed From Heaven to Hell which tells the story of the Salford, Greater Manchester Pals battalion who fought at the Battle of the Somme in WW1. Jenkins directed Virtuoso by Bill Humble at 3MT Theatre and produced and directed the MTA award-winning Narcissist in the Mirror (written by and starring her daughter Rosie Fleeshman).Sue is about to direct Bette & Joan by Anton Burge at Hope Mikk Theatre.

Personal life
Jenkins is married to the actor David Fleeshman and they have three children, actors Emily, Richard and Rosie. Jenkins and her eldest daughter Emily are founders of The Actors' Lab Ltd, a drama academy in Manchester. They are also patrons of the 24:7 Theatre Festival and Feelgood Theatre.

Filmography

References

External links

1958 births
Living people
20th-century English actresses
21st-century English actresses
Actresses from Liverpool
English stage actresses
English soap opera actresses
English television actresses
Show business families of the United Kingdom